Donald Ainslie Henderson (September 7, 1928 – August 19, 2016) was an American medical doctor, educator, and epidemiologist who directed a 10-year international effort (1967–1977) that eradicated smallpox throughout the world and launched international childhood vaccination programs. From 1977 to 1990, he was Dean of the Johns Hopkins School of Public Health. Later, he played a leading role in instigating national programs for public health preparedness and response following biological attacks and national disasters. At the time of his death, he was Professor and Dean Emeritus of the Johns Hopkins Bloomberg School of Public Health, and Professor of Medicine and Public Health at the University of Pittsburgh, as well as Distinguished Scholar at the UPMC Center for Health Security.

Early life and education
Henderson was born in Lakewood, Ohio, on September 7, 1928, of Scots-Canadian immigrant parents. His father, David Henderson, was an engineer; his mother, Eleanor McMillan, was a nurse. His interest in medicine was inspired by a Canadian uncle, William McMillan, who was a general practitioner and senior member of the Canadian House of Commons.

Henderson graduated from Oberlin College in 1950 and received his MD from the University of Rochester School of Medicine in 1954. He was a resident physician in medicine at the Mary Imogene Bassett Hospital in Cooperstown, New York, and, later, a Public Health Service Officer in the Epidemic Intelligence Service of the Communicable Disease Center (now the Centers for Disease Control and Prevention—CDC). He earned an MPH degree in 1960 from the Johns Hopkins School of Hygiene and Public Health (now the Johns Hopkins Bloomberg School of Public Health).

Research and career

Eradication of smallpox
Henderson served as Chief of the CDC virus diseaser surveillance programs from 1960 to 1965, working closely with epidemiologist Alexander Langmuir. During this period, he and his unit developed a proposal for a United States Agency for International Development (USAID) program to eliminate smallpox and control measles during a 5-year period in 18 contiguous countries in western and central Africa. This project was funded by USAID, with field operations beginning in 1967.

The USAID initiative provided an important impetus to a World Health Organization (WHO) program to eradicate smallpox throughout the world within a 10-year period. In 1966, Henderson moved to Geneva to become director of the campaign. At that time, smallpox was occurring widely throughout Brazil and in 30 countries in Africa and South Asia. More than 10 million cases and 2 million deaths were occurring annually. Vaccination brought some control, but the key strategy was "surveillance-containment". This technique entailed rapid reporting of cases from all health units and prompt vaccination of household members and close contacts of confirmed cases.  WHO staff and advisors from some 73 countries worked closely with national staff. The last case occurred in Somalia on October 26, 1977, only 10 years after the program began.  Three years later, the World Health Assembly recommended that smallpox vaccination could cease. Smallpox is the first human disease ever to be eradicated. This success gave impetus to WHO's global Expanded Program on Immunization, which targeted other vaccine-preventable diseases, including poliomyelitis, measles, tetanus, diphtheria, and whooping cough. Now targeted for eradication are poliomyelitis and Guinea Worm disease; after 25 years, this objective is close to being achieved.

Later work
From 1977 through August 1990, Henderson was Dean of the Johns Hopkins School of Public Health. After being awarded the 1986 National Medal of Science by Ronald Reagan for his work leading the World Health Organization (WHO) smallpox eradication campaign, Henderson launched a public struggle to reverse the Reagan administration’s decision to default on WHO payments. In 1991, he was appointed associate director for life sciences, Office of Science and Technology Policy, Executive Office of the President (1991–93) and, later, deputy assistant secretary and senior science advisor in the Department of Health and Human Services (HHS). In 1998, he became the founding director of the Johns Hopkins Center for Civilian Biodefense Strategies, now the Johns Hopkins Center for Health Security.

Following the September 11, 2001, attack on the World Trade Center, HHS Secretary Tommy G. Thompson asked Henderson to assume responsibility for the Office of Public Health Preparedness (later the Office of the Assistant Secretary for Preparedness and Response). For this purpose, $3 billion was appropriated by Congress.

In 2006, Henderson published an academic paper critical of social distancing as a pandemic measure, saying it would "result in significant disruption of the social functioning of communities and result in possibly serious economic problems".

At the time of his death, he served as the Editor Emeritus of the academic journal Health Security (formerly Biosecurity and Bioterrorism: Biodefense Strategy, Practice, and Science).

Honors and awards

 1975 – George McDonald Medal, London School of Tropical Medicine
 1978 – Public Welfare Medal, National Academy of Sciences
 1985 – Albert Schweitzer International Prize for Medicine
 1986 – National Medal of Science in Biology
 1988 – The Japan Prize, shared with Isao Arita and Frank Fenner
 1990 – Health for All Medal, World Health Organization
 1994 – Albert B. Sabin Gold Medal, Sabin Foundation
 1995 – John Stearns Medal, New York Academy of Medicine
 1996 – Edward Jenner Medal, Royal Society of Medicine
 2001 – Clan Henderson Society, Chiefs Order
 2002 – Presidential Medal of Freedom
 2013 – Order of Brilliant Star, with Grand Cordon, Republic of China
 2014 – Prince Mahidol Award, Thailand
 2015 – Charles Merieux Award, National Foundation for Infectious Diseases

Seventeen universities conferred honorary degrees on Henderson.

Selected publications

 Fenner F, Henderson DA, Arita I, Jezek Z, Ladnyi. (1988) Smallpox and Its Eradication , Geneva, World Health Organization. The definitive archival history of smallpox.
 Henderson DA. (2009) Smallpox, the Death of a Disease New York: Prometheus Books
 Henderson DA (1993) Surveillance systems and intergovernmental cooperation. In: Morse SS, ed. Emerging Viruses. New York: Oxford University Press: 283–289.
 Henderson DA, Borio LL (2005) Bioterrorism: an overview. In Principles and Practice of Infectious Diseases (Eds. Mandell MD, Bennett JE, Dolin R) Phil, Churchill Livingstone, 3591–3601.
 Henderson DA (2010) The global eradication of smallpox: Historical Perspective and Future Prospects in The Global Eradication of Smallpox (Ed: Bhattacharya S, Messenger S) Orient Black Swan, London. 7–35
 
 
 
 Henderson DA. (1967) Smallpox eradication and measles-control programs in West and Central Africa: Theoretical and practical approaches and problems. Industry and Trop Health VI, 112–120, Harvard School of Public Health, Boston.
 
 
 
 
 .

Personal life
Henderson married Nana Irene Bragg in 1951. The couple had a daughter and two sons. He died at Gilchrist Hospice, Towson, Maryland, at the age of 87, after fracturing his hip.

References

External link

1928 births
2016 deaths
American public health doctors
Donald Ainslie Henderson
Oberlin College alumni
People from Lakewood, Ohio
National Medal of Science laureates
University of Pittsburgh faculty
Johns Hopkins Bloomberg School of Public Health alumni
Smallpox eradication
Vaccinologists
American people of Canadian descent
American people of Scottish descent
Presidential Medal of Freedom recipients
Johns Hopkins Bloomberg School of Public Health
Members of the National Academy of Medicine